Seyed Javad Razavian is an Iranian film actor, voice actor, presenter and director and television actor, known mainly for appearing in popular sitcom series.

Filmography 
 Harf too harf
 Sib-e Khandeh
 Sefr Darejeh
 Pavarchin (2002, TV series)
 Baghcheye Minoo (2003, TV series)
 Jayezeye Bozorg (2004, TV series)
 Sharlatan (2004, feature film)
 Farar-e Bozorg
 Erse Babam (2005, TV series, also director)
 Shakhe goli baraye aroos (2005, feature film)
  Kolahi Baraye Baran 2006 film
 Char Khooneh (2007, TV series)
 Dah Raghami (2008, Feature Film)
 Gharargahe Maskooni (2008, TV series)
 Deldadeh (2008, feature film)
 Gharargah e Maskooni, TV series, also director)
 Ekhrajiha 2 (2009, film)
 Charchanguli (2009, film)
 Be Rooh Pedaram (2010, film)
 Limoo Torsh (2010, film)
 I'm just kidding'' (2014, TV series)

References

1974 births
Living people
People from Qom
Iranian comedians
Iranian film directors
Iranian male film actors
Iranian stand-up comedians
Iranian television directors
Iranian male television actors
21st-century Iranian male actors